James David McClen (born 13 May 1979) is an English retired footballer who played as a defender or midfielder.

Early life and youth career
McClen attended St. Benet Biscop Catholic High School in Bedlington, Northumberland. He honed his footballing skills at the youth academy of Newcastle United at the age of 10 after being spotted whilst playing for Cramlington Juniors.

Playing career

Newcastle United
McClen debuted for Newcastle in 1999 against Tottenham Hotspur under the management of Ruud Gullit. Gullit offered McClen a long-term deal which was promptly signed. He drifted out of the first-team picture for a few years, only to get a break in the team when injuries took their toll on Newcastle. McClen took his chance, including a goal against Peterborough United in the FA Cup, going on to make 10 more appearances in the 2001–02 season, including against Arsenal in the FA Cup. McClen's performances that season, in which Newcastle finished 4th, earned him another long-term deal which was promptly signed. However, McClen struggled to retain his place in the first team before eventually being released in 2005 to Carlisle United.

Later career
McClen's spell at Carlisle only lasted a few months before he was released. He then went to Blyth Spartans on a short-term basis. He returned to the Football League to join Shrewsbury Town, but he was released due to concerns over his fitness levels. In June 2006 he signed a 12-month contract with Kidderminster Harriers of the Football Conference. On 3 November 2006, McClen returned to the north-east to play for Bedlington Terriers on loan.

McClen was released by Kidderminster in January 2007 and signed for Hamilton Academical until the end of the season. However, he was released in March 2007.

In August 2007, McClen joined Northern Premier League outfit Gateshead ahead of the 2007–08 season. January 2008 saw McClen join Newcastle Blue Star on loan until the end of the season. The move became permanent at the start of the 2008–09 season.

After Newcastle Blue Star dissolved, McClen joined Morpeth Town, before a trial with Thai Premier League side Pattaya United F.C. in January 2010. McClen opted to stay in the north-east as he had a young family.

External links

References

1979 births
Living people
People from Cramlington
Footballers from Northumberland
English footballers
English expatriate footballers
Expatriate footballers in Thailand
Association football defenders
Association football midfielders
Association football utility players
Newcastle United F.C. players
Motherwell F.C. players
Carlisle United F.C. players
Blyth Spartans A.F.C. players
Shrewsbury Town F.C. players
Kidderminster Harriers F.C. players
Bedlington Terriers F.C. players
Hamilton Academical F.C. players
Gateshead F.C. players
Newcastle Blue Star F.C. players
Premier League players
Scottish Premier League players
English Football League players
National League (English football) players
Scottish Football League players
Northern Premier League players
Northern Football League players
Morpeth Town A.F.C. players